Pariveh-ye Olya (also Romanized as Parīveh-ye ‘Olyā; also known as Parīvak, Parīvar-e Bālā, Parīveh, and Parīveh-ye Bālā) is a village in Howmeh Rural District, in the Central District of Harsin County, Kermanshah Province, Iran. At the 2006 census, its population was 110, in 23 families.

References 

Populated places in Harsin County